The Committee on Energy and Commerce is one of the oldest standing committees of the United States House of Representatives. Established in 1795, it has operated continuously—with various name changes and jurisdictional changes—for more than 200 years. The two other House standing committees with such continuous operation are the House Ways and Means Committee and the House Rules Committee. The committee has served as the principal guide for the House in matters relating to the promotion of commerce and to the public's health and marketplace interests, with the relatively recent addition of energy considerations among them. Due to its broad jurisdiction, it is considered one of the most powerful committees in the House.

Role of the committee
The House Committee on Energy and Commerce has developed what is arguably the broadest (non-tax-oriented) jurisdiction of any congressional committee. The committee maintains principal responsibility for legislative oversight relating to telecommunications, consumer protection, food and drug safety, public health, air quality and environmental health, the supply and delivery of energy, and interstate and foreign commerce. This jurisdiction extends over five Cabinet-level departments and seven independent agencies—from the Department of Energy, Health and Human Services, the Transportation Department to the Federal Trade Commission, Food and Drug Administration, and Federal Communications Commission—and sundry quasi-governmental organizations.

Jurisdiction 
The Energy and Commerce Committee has the broadest jurisdiction of any authorizing committee in Congress. It legislates on a wide variety of issues, including:

 health care, including mental health and substance abuse
 health insurance, including Medicare and Medicaid
 biomedical research and development
 food, drug, device and cosmetic safety
 environmental protection 
 clean air and climate change
 safe drinking water
 toxic chemicals and hazardous waste
 national energy policy
 renewable energy and conservation
 nuclear facilities
 electronic communications and the internet
 broadcast and cable television
 privacy, cybersecurity and data security
 consumer protection and product safety
 motor vehicle safety
 travel, tourism and sports   
 interstate and foreign commerce

Members, 118th Congress

Resolutions electing members:  (Chair),  (Ranking Member),  (R),  (D)

Subcommittees
To manage the wide variety of issues it encounters, the committee relies on the front-line work of six subcommittees, one more than during the 111th Congress. During the 111th Congress, Chairman Henry Waxman combined the traditionally separate energy and environment subcommittees into a single subcommittee. New Chairman Fred Upton restored them as separate subcommittees at the start of the 112th Congress, and they have been retained to this day.

Historical membership rosters

117th Congress

Resolutions electing members:  (Chair),  (Ranking Member),  (D),  (R)

Subcommittees

116th Congress 

Sources:  (Chair),  (Ranking Member),  (D),  (R)

Subcommittees

115th Congress

114th Congress

History
The committee was originally formed as the Committee on Commerce and Manufactures on December 14, 1795. Prior to this, legislation was drafted in the Committee of the Whole or in special ad hoc committees, appointed for specific limited purposes. However the growing demands of the new nation required that Congress establish a permanent committee to manage its constitutional authority under the Commerce Clause to "regulate Commerce with foreign Nations, and among the several States."

From this time forward, as the nation grew and Congress dealt with new public policy concerns and created new committees, the Energy and Commerce Committee has maintained its central position as Congress's monitor of commercial progress—a focus reflected in its changing jurisdiction, both in name and practice.

In 1819, the committee's name was changed to the Committee on Commerce, reflecting the creation of a separate Manufacturers Committee and also the increasing scope of and complexity of American commercial activity, which was expanding the committee's jurisdiction from navigational aids and the nascent general health service to foreign trade and tariffs. Thomas J. Bliley, who chaired the committee from 1995 to 2000, chose to use this traditional name, which underscores the committee's role for Congress on this front.

In 1891, in emphasis of the committee's evolving activities, the name was again changed to the Committee on Interstate and Foreign Commerce—a title it maintained until 1981, when, under incoming Chairman John Dingell, the committee first assumed what is now its present name to emphasize its lead role in guiding the energy policy of the United States. Dingell regained chairmanship of the committee in 2007 after having served as ranking member since 1995. In late 2008, Henry Waxman initiated a successful challenge to unseat Dingell as chairman. His challenge was unusual as the party caucus traditionally elects chairmen based on committee seniority. Waxman formally became chairman at the start of the 111th Congress.

Previous chairs

Committee on Commerce and Manufactures

Committee on Commerce

Committee on Interstate and Foreign Commerce

Committee on Energy and Commerce

See also
 List of current United States House of Representatives committees

References

External links

 (Archive)
House Energy and Commerce Committee. Legislation activity and reports, Congress.gov.
House Energy and Commerce Committee Hearings and Meetings Video. Congress.gov

Energy
Energy in the United States
1795 establishments in the United States
Organizations established in 1795